The Shell Technology Centre was a chemical research institute in northern Cheshire, near Stanlow, owned by Anglo-Dutch Shell.

History

World War II
The site was first set up by Shell for the Ministry of Aircraft Production as the Aero Engine Research Laboratory.

Vehicle engineering
It returned to Shell ownership in April 1947. The site had 70 scientists, and around 250 technicians working on quartz combustion tubes, direct fuel injection, butane fuel and the atomisation of fuel.

The neighbouring oil refinery opened in 1949, although a smaller plant had been there since 1924.

In the 1950s it was one of three main Shell research sites in the UK, the others being in Kent and Buckinghamshire.

In 1962, Shell spent £25m on research, with 19 worldwide research centres, 8 in Europe, and 11 in the US. 

By the early 1960s Shell also had its Central Laboratories in Surrey (which opened in 1956), the Tunstall Laboratory, and Chemical Enzymology Laboratory at Sittingbourne in Kent
Shell X-100 was Europe's top selling motor oil (lubrication).

North Sea oil was produced from 1975.

Overseas research
In the mid 1970s Shell had around 5,000 worldwide research staff. In 1975 it closed two of its four British research sites, and one in Delft in the Netherlands. The Surrey research site closed with its 430 employees, with its work transferred work to Amsterdam, the Netherlands, and Cheshire with the centre's 850 employees. Before the closures, Shell had 2080 employees at British research centres.

The main Dutch research sites were at Amsterdam (Royal Shell Laboratory Amsterdam) and Rijswijk.

Directors
From 1948 the Director was CG Williams.  Sir Morris Sugden FRS was Director from 3 April 1967.

GG Rose was Director from December 1975.

Closure
Shell closed its research centres in the UK in 2014, moving the research to Germany. Shell had sold the neighbouring oil refinery. 280 staff moved to London and Manchester, with 170 to northern Germany.

Research
The site was largely an automotive engineering research facility.

Work was carried out on direct fuel injection and butane-powered engines.

Lubricants
Its scientists researched lubrication with the Ubbelohde viscometer. In 1949 Britain's first diesel train, with an English Electric engine, had Shell lubricating oil. Two-thirds of the lubricating oil made in UK was Shell, with Shell conducting £6m of research in 1949. The centre researched tyres, paint, textiles, and detergents.
 BEA airliners only had Shell lubricants.

In the 1960s automotive companies from Europe would test automotive engines there.

Pollution
The site conducted work with British Leyland on pollution in the late 1960s, due to increasing legislation in the US, costing £100,000 a year, overlooked by Morris Sugden. BP conducted similar research at its Sunbury Research Centre.

Formula 1 racing
The site researched fuel for the Ferrari F1 team (Scuderia Ferrari).

Structure
The site is 66 acres. It was situated north of the M56, north-west of junction 14, at the Hapsford services (a Shell services), to the north of the A5117. It is directly east of the large oil refinery, south of the neighbouring Hooton–Helsby line.

See also

 Castrol Technology Centre in Oxfordshire (owned by BP)
 The former Esso Research Centre in Oxfordshire
 Widnes Laboratory
 Winnington Laboratory

References

Automotive industry in the United Kingdom
Chemical industry in the United Kingdom
Chemical research institutes
Energy research institutes
Engine technology
Engineering research institutes
History of the petroleum industry in the United Kingdom
Laboratories in the United Kingdom
Petroleum organizations
Physics laboratories
Research institutes in Cheshire
Shell plc buildings and structures